Robert Ireland (born 16 November 1948) is a former Australian rules footballer who played with Fitzroy in the Victorian Football League (VFL).

Notes

External links 
		

Living people
1948 births
Australian rules footballers from Victoria (Australia)
Fitzroy Football Club players